David Howard (October 6, 1896 – December 21, 1941) was an American film director. He directed 46 films between 1930 and 1941, 29 of them westerns starring George O'Brien, including the acclaimed Mystery Ranch (1932). He was born as David Paget Davis III in Philadelphia, Pennsylvania, and died in Los Angeles, California.

Selected filmography

 There Were Thirteen (1931)
 The Rainbow Trail (1931) 
 The Golden West (1932)
 Mystery Ranch  (1932)
 The Mystery Squadron (1933) (writer & director)
 Robbers' Roost (1933)
 Smoke Lightning (1933)
 The Lost Jungle (1934) (writer & screenplay)
 In Old Santa Fe (1934)
 The Marines Are Coming (1934)
 Whispering Smith Speaks (1935)
 Hard Rock Harrigan (1936)
 Thunder Mountain (1935)
 Conflict (1936)
 Daniel Boone (1936)
 The Border Patrolman (1936)
 The Mine with the Iron Door (1936)
 Windjammer (1937) (associate producer)
 Park Avenue Logger (1937)
 Painted Desert (1938)
 Border G-Man (1938)
 Lawless Valley (1938)
 Hollywood Stadium Mystery (1938)
 The Renegade Ranger (1938)
 Gun Law (1938)
 The Rookie Cop (1939)
 Timber Stampede (1939)
 Arizona Legion (1939) 
 Marshal of Mesa City (1939)
 Trouble in Sundown (1939) 
 The Fighting Gringo (1939)
 Prairie Law (1940) 
 Triple Justice (1940)
 Bullet Code (1940)
 Legion of the Lawless (1940)
 Dude Cowboy'' (1941)

External links

1896 births
1941 deaths
Artists from Philadelphia
Film directors from Pennsylvania